The Victory Garden is an American public television program about gardening and other outdoor activities, which was produced by station WGBH in Boston, Massachusetts, and distributed by PBS. It was the oldest gardening program produced for television in the United States, premiering April 16, 1975.

History
The show was originally called Crockett's Victory Garden for its first host, James Underwood Crockett. On each episode, Crockett demonstrates and cares for a vegetable, fruit, and flower garden, shows you how to build a cold frame, and why salt marsh hay was useful as a mulch. At the end of each episode, Crockett was in the greenhouse, as he answered viewer questions about gardening, which were sent in by viewers. Following Crockett's death at the age of 63, Bob Thomson hosted the program from 1979 to 1991 and the show was renamed The Victory Garden. With Thomson at the helm, The Victory Garden began to broaden its scope. In addition to the regular gardening demonstrations, the show began to make room for more guests and travel features. Marian Morash, wife of series producer Russell Morash, appeared on the air to do her recipes on the program from 1979 to 2001.

Roger Swain hosted the program from 1991 to 2002, Michael Weishan hosted the program from 2002 to 2007. Jamie Durie hosted the program from 2007 to 2010.
In 2013, the show was relaunched in partnership with Edible Communities, and it became The Victory Garden's EdibleFeast. It was produced for two seasons.

Major publications
Crockett, James Underwood. (1981). Crockett's Flower Garden. New York: Little, Brown. .
Crockett, James Underwood. (1978). Crockett's Indoor Garden. New York: Little, Brown. .
Crockett, James Underwood. (1977). Crockett's Victory Garden. New York: Little, Brown. .
Morash, Marian. (1982). The Victory Garden Cookbook. New York: Knopf. .
Thomson, Bob. (1987). The New Victory Garden. New York: Little, Brown. .
Weishan, Michael and Laurie Donnelly. (2006). The Victory Garden Companion. New York: William Morrow. .
Wilson, Jim. (1990). Masters of the Victory Garden. New York: Little, Brown. .
Wirth, Thomas. (1984). The Victory Garden Landscape Guide. New York: Little, Brown. .

References

External links
PBS: The Victory Garden

1980s American television series
1990s American television series
2000s American television series
1975 American television series debuts
Television series by WGBH
PBS original programming
Gardening television
2015 American television series endings